Alois Navratil (born 17 June 1896, date of death unknown) was an Austrian sports shooter. He competed in the 50 m rifle event at the 1936 Summer Olympics.

References

1896 births
Year of death missing
Austrian male sport shooters
Olympic shooters of Austria
Shooters at the 1936 Summer Olympics
Place of birth missing
20th-century Austrian people